Damián Malrechauffe Verdún (born 19 October 1984 in Montevideo) is a Uruguayan footballer who currently plays C.A. Rentistas.

References

External links
 Player profile 
 
 

1984 births
Living people
Footballers from Montevideo
Uruguayan footballers
Uruguayan expatriate footballers
Association football defenders
Danubio F.C. players
Colo-Colo footballers
Club Tijuana footballers
Cúcuta Deportivo footballers
Racing Club de Montevideo players
C.A. Rentistas players
Uruguayan Primera División players
Uruguayan Segunda División players
Liga MX players
Chilean Primera División players
Categoría Primera A players
Argentine Primera División players
Uruguayan people of Belgian descent
Uruguayan expatriate sportspeople in Chile
Uruguayan expatriate sportspeople in Mexico
Uruguayan expatriate sportspeople in Argentina
Uruguayan expatriate sportspeople in Colombia
Expatriate footballers in Chile
Expatriate footballers in Mexico
Expatriate footballers in Argentina
Expatriate footballers in Colombia